Subterfuge is a real-time strategy video game developed by Ron Carmel and Noel Llopis. It is loosely based on the strategic board game Diplomacy.

The game takes place in an underwater world where players use diplomacy and tactics to defeat their opponents. It features minimalist art, except for the specialist portraits, which were drawn by Shane Nakamura.

Gameplay
Subterfuge takes place in real time to allow for diplomacy; an average game lasts for about a week but can be longer or shorter. Despite taking a week to play, the developers claimed the game was still "short". A game can have anywhere from 2 to 10 players. Diplomacy is highly encouraged in Subterfuge, and players only communicate through in-game messages that can be sent to other players. This allows for negotiation of strategy and teamwork which is vital for players to win. To win a normal game, a player must gain 200 neptunium, through mines which can be made through the use of combat units. Throughout the game, players fight over outposts spread across the map in an attempt to increase production capacity and rate for combat units. "Dominion rules" are also available, where instead of getting Neptunium, the goal is to control a certain amount of outposts.

Time machine

Due to the 24 hour nature of the game, Subterfuge does not require a player to be in the game to issue moves (orders); players can instead plan orders in advance using the time machine. This feature allows for complex maneuvers to be performed. The time machine also allows the viewing of past events and a prediction of the future based on player knowledge. The time machine works by letting players go to the time they wish to have the order executed; they then play the game as if it were in the present. When the set amount of time has passed, the order will be carried out, even if the player is not present. Developer Ron Carmel said that he implemented this feature based on previous experience playing Neptune's Pride, which lacked this feature, leading to inconvenience. While most players can only schedule four moves using the time machine, players who have bought the full game can issue an unlimited amount of future orders. The time machine also moves forward when you launch a submarine, which shows the player what the map will look like when the sub arrives.

Reception

Subterfuge has been met with mostly positive reception; it has been praised for having simplicity and tactical depth. Pocket Tactics gave it the award for the best multiplayer game of 2015. Three weeks after launch, Subterfuge had been installed 113,000 times on Android and 107,000 times on iOS; it earned $23,000 in the three-week period.

References

External links

2015 video games
Science fiction video games
Real-time strategy video games
Multiplayer video games
IOS games
Android (operating system) games
English-language-only video games
Video games developed in the United States